The list of mammals of Washington lists mammalian species that live in the U.S. state of Washington, including 9 introduced mammal species. The list does not include species found exclusively in captivity.

Opossums 

Family: Didelphidae
Virginia opossum, Didelphis virginiana introduced

Shrews and moles 

Family: Soricidae
Marsh shrew, Sorex bendirii
Cinereus shrew, Sorex cinereus
American pygmy shrew, Sorex hoyi
Merriam's shrew, Sorex merriami
Montane shrew, Sorex monticolus
Preble's shrew, Sorex preblei
Olympic shrew, Sorex rohweri
Trowbridge's shrew, Sorex trowbridgii
Vagrant shrew, Sorex vagrans

Family: Talpidae
American shrew mole, Neurotrichus gibbsii
Coast mole, Scapanus orarius
Townsend's mole, Scapanus townsendii

Bats 

Family: Vespertilionidae
Pallid bat, Antrozous pallidus
Townsend's big-eared bat, Corynorhinus townsendii
Big brown bat, Eptesicus fuscus
Spotted bat, Euderma maculatum
Silver-haired bat, Lasionycteris noctivagans
Hoary bat, Lasiurus cinereus
California myotis, Myotis californicus
Western small-footed myotis, Myotis ciliolabrum
Long-eared myotis, Myotis evotis
Keen's myotis, Myotis keenii
Little brown myotis, Myotis lucifugus
Fringed myotis, Myotis thysanodes
Long-legged myotis, Myotis volans
Yuma myotis, Myotis yumanensis
Canyon bat, Parastrellus hesperus

Lagomorphs 

Family: Ochotonidae
American pika, Ochotona princeps

Family: Leporidae
Pygmy rabbit, Brachylagus idahoensis
Snowshoe hare, Lepus americanus
Black-tailed jackrabbit, Lepus californicus
White-tailed jackrabbit, Lepus townsendii
European rabbit, Oryctolagus cuniculus introduced
Eastern cottontail, Sylvilagus floridanus
Mountain cottontail, Sylvilagus nuttallii

Rodents 

Family: Aplodontiidae
Mountain beaver, Aplodontia rufa

Family: Sciuridae
Eastern gray squirrel, Sciurus carolinensis introduced
Western gray squirrel, Sciurus griseus
Fox squirrel, Sciurus niger
Douglas squirrel, Tamiasciurus douglasii
American red squirrel, Tamiasciurus hudsonicus
Hoary marmot, Marmota caligata
Yellow-bellied marmot, Marmota flaviventris
Olympic marmot, Marmota olympus
California ground squirrel, Otospermophilus beecheyi
Golden-mantled ground squirrel, Callospermophilus lateralis
Cascade golden-mantled ground squirrel, Callospermophilus saturatus
Columbian ground squirrel, Urocitellus columbianus
Piute ground squirrel, Urocitellus mollis
Townsend's ground squirrel, Urocitellus townsendii
Washington ground squirrel, Urocitellus washingtoni
Yellow-pine chipmunk, Tamias amoenus
Least chipmunk, Tamias minimus
Red-tailed chipmunk, Tamias ruficaudus
Townsend's chipmunk, Tamias townsendii
Northern flying squirrel, Glaucomys sabrinus

Family: Castoridae
American beaver, Castor canadensis

Family: Heteromyidae
Ord's kangaroo rat, Dipodomys ordii
Great Basin pocket mouse, Perognathus parvus

Family: Geomyidae
Mazama pocket gopher, Thomomys mazama
Northern pocket gopher, Thomomys talpoides

Family: Dipodidae
Western jumping mouse, Zapus princeps
Pacific jumping mouse, Zapus trinotatus

Family: Cricetidae
Sagebrush vole, Lemmiscus curtatus
Gray-tailed vole, Microtus canicaudus
Long-tailed vole, Microtus longicaudus
Montane vole, Microtus montanus
Creeping vole, Microtus oregoni
Western meadow vole, Microtus drummondii
Water vole, Microtus richardsoni
Townsend's vole, Microtus townsendii
Red-backed vole, Clethrionomys gapperi
Muskrat, Ondatra zibethicus
Western heather vole, Phenacomys intermedius
Northern bog lemming, Synaptomys borealis
Bushy-tailed woodrat, Neotoma cinerea
Northern grasshopper mouse, Onychomys leucogaster
Western deer mouse, Peromyscus sonoriensis
Northwestern deer mouse, Peromyscus keeni
Western harvest mouse, Reithrodontomys megalotis

Family: Muridae
House mouse, Mus musculus introduced
Norway rat, Rattus norvegicus introduced
Black rat, Rattus rattus introduced

Family: Erethizontidae
North American porcupine, Erethizon dorsatum

Family: Myocastoridae
Nutria, Myocastor coypus introduced

Carnivorans

Family: Canidae
Coyote, Canis latrans
Gray wolf, Canis lupus 
Gray fox, Urocyon cinereoargenteus 
Red fox, Vulpes vulpes 

Family: Ursidae
American black bear, Ursus americanus 
Brown bear, Ursus arctos 
Grizzly bear, U. a. horribilis

Family: Otariidae
Northern fur seal, Callorhinus ursinus
Steller sea lion, Eumetopias jubatus
California sea lion, Zalophus californianus

Family: Phocidae
Northern elephant seal, Mirounga angustirostris
Harbor seal, Phoca vitulina

Family: Procyonidae
Raccoon, Procyon lotor 

Family: Mephitidae
Striped skunk, Mephitis mephitis 
Western spotted skunk, Spilogale gracilis 

Family: Felidae
Canada lynx, Lynx canadensis
Bobcat, Lynx rufus 
Cougar, Puma concolor

Family: Mustelidae
Sea otter, Enhydra lutris
North American river otter, Lontra canadensis
Long-tailed weasel, Neogale frenata
American mink, Neogale vison
Fisher, Pekania pennanti
American ermine, Mustela richardsonii
Wolverine, Gulo gulo
Pacific marten, Martes caurina
American badger, Taxidea taxus

Whales, dolphins and porpoises

Family: Balaenidae
North Pacific right whale, Eubalaena japonica

Family: Balaenopteridae
Minke whale, Balaenoptera acutorostrata
Sei whale, Balaenoptera borealis
Blue whale, Balaenoptera musculus
Fin whale, Balaenoptera physalus
Humpback Whale, Megaptera novaengliae
Gray whale, Eschrictius robustus

Family: Delphinidae
Common dolphin, Delphinus delphis
Risso's dolphin, Grampus griseus
Pacific white-sided dolphin, Lagenorynchus obliquidens
Northern right whale dolphin, Lissodelphis borealis
Orca, Orcinus orca

Family: Phocoenidae
Harbor porpoise, Phocoena phocoena
Dall's porpoise, Phocoenoides dalli

Family: Physeteridae
Pygmy sperm whale, Kogia breviceps
Dwarf sperm whale, Kogia sima
Sperm whale, Physeter catodon

Family: Ziphiidae
Baird's beaked whale, Berardius bairdii
Hubbs' beaked whale, Mesoplodon carlhubbsi
Stejneger's beaked whale, Mesoplodon stejnegeri
Cuvier's beaked whale, Ziphius cavirostris

Even-toed ungulates

Family: Antilocapridae
Pronghorn, Antilocapra americana reintroduced

Family: Bovidae
American bison, Bison bison reintroduced
Mountain goat, Oreamnos americanus
Bighorn sheep, Ovis canadensis 

Family: Cervidae
Moose, Alces alces
Elk, Cervus canadensis 
Mule deer, Odocoileus hemionus
White-tailed deer, Odocoileus virginianius
Caribou, Rangifer tarandus
Boreal woodland caribou, R. t. caribou

References

Washington
Mammals